Emmanuel School of Mission (ESM) is a private educational institute of Emmanuel Community for a Roman Catholic missionary that operates boarding schools on four continents. These schools are situated in New York City, Roma, Salvador, Manila, Altötting, Bafoussam and Paray-le-Monial.

Structure and facilities
These boarding schools inhabit two-story buildings including a chapel, classrooms, bedrooms, a computer lab and a library.

Formation
More than 500 hours of intellectual, human, missionary and spiritual training are taught. The different subjects taught are : holy Scripture, foundations of the Faith, liturgy, art and faith, philosophy, moral theology, integral ecology, spiritual life, communication, evangelization, other religions, anthropology.

External links
 Official site : http://www.emmanuel.info/esm/
 Presentation on a YouTube video
 Official sites for : ESM Salvador, ESM Manila , ESM Roma, ESM Paray, ESM Altötting.

References 

Catholic secondary schools in New York (state)
Roman Catholic secondary schools in New York City
Christian schools
Catholic secondary schools in France
Educational institutions established in 1984
1984 establishments in France